Albert De Conti Cadassamare (29 January 1887 – 18 January 1967), professionally billed as Albert Conti, was an Austrian-Hungarian-born Italian-American film actor.

Life
Born in the village of Gorizia (now, part of Italy), Conti achieved moderate fame as an actor in American films, but first he specialized in law (high school and law college in Graz) and natural science, and married Patricia Cross. When World War I began, he became an officer. He was the son of Albert, Ritter Conti von Cedassamare and his wife, Countess Marie Bernhardine Anna Kaboga, a member of an old Ragusan/Dubrovnik noble family (see: House of Caboga). After his discharge from the Austrian army at the close of World War I, he came to America like many other now-impoverished postwar Europeans from both sides of the conflict.

Emigration to U.S.A.
Conti emigrated to the United States via the Port of Philadelphia in 1919. After settling in the new country, Conti was obliged to take a series of manual labor jobs, his patrician background notwithstanding. While working in the California oil fields, he answered an open call placed by director Erich von Stroheim, who was in search of an Austrian military officer to act as technical advisor for his upcoming film Merry-Go-Round (1923).

A better actor than most of his fellow Habsburg Empire expatriates, Conti was able to secure dignified character roles in several silent and sound films; his credits ranged from Josef von Sternberg's Morocco (1930) to the early Laurel and Hardy knockabout Slipping Wives (1927). He appeared in the 1928 silent film Dry Martini as a roué artist. Though he made his last film in 1942, Albert Conti remained in the industry as an employee of the MGM wardrobe department, where he worked until his retirement in 1962.

Selected filmography

External links

Austrian male film actors
Italian Austro-Hungarians
Nobility from Trieste
Actors from Trieste
1887 births
1967 deaths
Austro-Hungarian Army officers
Austro-Hungarian military personnel of World War I
Austrian male silent film actors
Austrian emigrants to the United States
American male film actors
20th-century American male actors
20th-century Austrian male actors
Austrian people of Italian descent